The 1991 Rhineland-Palatinate state election was held  on 21 April 1991 to elect the members of the Landtag of Rhineland-Palatinate. The incumbent coalition government of the Christian Democratic Union (CDU) and Free Democratic Party (FDP) led by Minister-President Carl-Ludwig Wagner was defeated, losing its majority. The Social Democratic Party (SPD) moved into first place, forming a coalition with the FDP. SPD leader Rudolf Scharping was subsequently elected as Minister-President.

Parties
The table below lists parties represented in the previous Landtag of Rhineland-Palatinate.

Election result

|-
| colspan=8 | 
|-
! colspan="2" | Party
! Votes
! %
! +/-
! Seats 
! +/-
! Seats %
|-
| bgcolor=| 
| align=left | Social Democratic Party (SPD)
| align=right| 951,695
| align=right| 44.8
| align=right| 6.0
| align=right| 47
| align=right| 7
| align=right| 46.5
|-
| bgcolor=| 
| align=left | Christian Democratic Union (CDU)
| align=right| 822,449
| align=right| 38.7
| align=right| 6.4
| align=right| 40
| align=right| 8
| align=right| 39.6
|-
| bgcolor=| 
| align=left | Free Democratic Party (FDP)
| align=right| 146,400
| align=right| 6.9
| align=right| 0.4
| align=right| 7
| align=right| 0
| align=right| 6.9
|-
| bgcolor=| 
| align=left | Alliance 90/The Greens (Grüne)
| align=right| 137,139
| align=right| 6.5
| align=right| 0.6
| align=right| 7
| align=right| 2
| align=right| 6.9
|-
! colspan=8|
|-
| bgcolor=| 
| align=left | The Republicans (REP)
| align=right| 43,380
| align=right| 2.0
| align=right| 2.0
| align=right| 0
| align=right| ±0
| align=right| 0
|-
| bgcolor=|
| align=left | Others
| align=right| 24,244
| align=right| 1.1
| align=right| 
| align=right| 0
| align=right| ±0
| align=right| 0
|-
! align=right colspan=2| Total
! align=right| 2,125,407
! align=right| 100.0
! align=right| 
! align=right| 101
! align=right| 1
! align=right| 
|-
! align=right colspan=2| Voter turnout
! align=right| 
! align=right| 73.9
! align=right| 3.1
! align=right| 
! align=right| 
! align=right| 
|}

1991
1991 elections in Germany